Kugatsu no Sotsugyō is the second album from Yoko Takahashi, including the hit single Blue no Tsubasa, which reached #66 in the Oricon weekly charts, while the album reached #85 and charted for two weeks.

Track listing

References

1993 albums
Yoko Takahashi albums